The 1973–74 Kansas Jayhawks men's basketball team represented the University of Kansas during the 1973–74 NCAA Division I men's basketball season.

Roster
Danny Knight
Roger Morningstar
Dale Greenlee
Norm Cook
Rick Suttle
Tom Kivisto
Tommie Smith
Dave Taynor
Nino Samuel
Donnie Von Moore
Reuben Shelton
Jack Hollis
Bob Emery
Paul Werner
Chris Barnthouse
Dwight Haley

Schedule

References

Kansas Jayhawks men's basketball seasons
Kansas Jay
Kansas Jay
NCAA Division I men's basketball tournament Final Four seasons
Kansas
Kansas